Kelani may refer to:

 Q'ilani, a mountain in Bolivia's Pacajes Province
 Q'ilani (Ingavi-Los Andes), a mountain in Bolivia's Ingavi and Los Andes provinces
 Kehlani, an American singer